The 2006 German Open (officially known as the Yonex German Open 2006 for sponsorship reasons) was a badminton tournament which took place at the RWE Rhein-Ruhr Sporthalle in Mülheim, Germany, on from 10 to 15 January 2006 and had a total purse of $80,000.

Tournament 
The 2006 German Open was the second tournament of the 2006 IBF World Grand Prix and also part of the German Open championships, which had been held since 1955.

Venue 
This international tournament was held at RWE Rhein-Ruhr Sporthalle in Mülheim, Germany.

Point distribution 
Below is the point distribution table for each phase of the tournament based on the IBF points system for the IBF World Grand Prix 3-star event.

Prize pool 
The total prize money for this tournament was US$80,000. The distribution of the prize money was in accordance with IBF regulations.

Men's singles

Seeds 

 Lin Dan (semi-finals)
 Bao Chunlai (third round)
 Lee Hyun-il (quarter-finals)
 Chen Hong (final)
 Ng Wei (third round)
 Shon Seung-mo (first round)
 Niels Christian Kaldau (first round)
 Shōji Satō (second round)
 Bobby Milroy (second round)
 Park Sung-hwan (third round)
 Dicky Palyama (third round)
 Björn Joppien (third round)
 Chen Jin (champion)
 Eric Pang (second round)
 Przemysław Wacha (withdrew)
 Geoff Bellingham (first round)

Finals

Top half

Section 1

Section 2

Bottom half

Section 3

Section 4

Women's singles

Seeds 

 Zhang Ning (champion)
 Xie Xingfang (quarter-finals)
 Wang Chen (semi-finals)
 Pi Hongyan (quarter-finals)
 Huaiwen Xu (second round)
 Yao Jie (second round)
 Mia Audina (second round)
 Tracey Hallam (second round)

Finals

Top half

Section 1

Section 2

Bottom half

Section 3

Section 4

Men's doubles

Seeds 

 Jens Eriksen / Martin Lundgaard Hansen (withdrew)
 Cai Yun / Fu Haifeng (quarter-finals)
 Michał Łogosz / Robert Mateusiak (quarter-finals)
 John Gordon / Daniel Shirley (first round)
 Robert Blair / Anthony Clark (final)
 Jung Jae-sung / Lee Yong-dae (champions)
 Keita Masuda / Tadashi Ōtsuka (semi-finals)
 Liu Kwok Wa / Albertus Susanto Njoto (semi-finals)

Finals

Top half

Section 1

Section 2

Bottom half

Section 3

Section 4

Women's doubles

Seeds 

 Gao Ling / Huang Sui (final)
 Lee Hyo-jung / Lee Kyung-won (quarter-finals)
 Yang Wei / Zhang Jiewen (champions)
 Kumiko Ogura / Reiko Shiota (first round)
 Zhang Dan / Zhao Tingting (semi-finals)
 Wei Yili / Zhang Yawen (semi-finals)
 Cheng Wen-hsing / Chien Yu-chin (quarter-finals)
 Aki Akao / Tomomi Matsuda (first round)

Finals

Top half

Section 1

Section 2

Bottom half

Section 3

Section 4

Mixed doubles

Seeds 

 Lee Jae-jin / Lee Hyo-jung (semi-finals)
 Zhang Jun / Gao Ling (champions)
 Xie Zhongbo / Zhang Yawen (final)
 Daniel Shirley / Sare Petersen (semi-finals)
 Robert Blair / Anthony Clark (quarter-finals)
 Albertus Susanto Njoto / Li Wing Mui (first round)
 Anggun Nugroho / Yunita Tetty (quarter-finals)
 Travis Denney / Kate Wilson-Smith (first round)

Finals

Top half

Section 1

Section 2

Bottom half

Section 3

Section 4

References

External links 
Official website

2006 IBF World Grand Prix
German Open (badminton)
German Open
Open